Christian Garin and Nicolás Jarry were the defending champions, but did not play together. Garin partnered with Julio Peralta and lost in the first round. Jarry partnered with Marcelo Demoliner and lost in the second round.

Seeds

Draw

References
 Main Draw

Challenger ATP Cachantún Cup - Doubles
2015 - Doubles